Khady Fall Sall (born 2 June 1987) is a Senegalese footballer who plays as a midfielder. She has been a member of the Senegal women's national team.

International career
Sall capped for Senegal at senior level during the 2012 African Women's Championship.

References

1987 births
Living people
Women's association football midfielders
Senegalese women's footballers
Senegal women's international footballers